The tornado outbreak of April 6–8, 2006, was a major tornado outbreak in the central and parts of the southern United States that began on April 6, 2006, in the Great Plains and continued until April 8 in South Carolina, with most of the activity on April 7. The hardest-hit region was Middle Tennessee, where several strong tornadoes devastated entire neighborhoods and left ten people dead. Some of the worst damage took place in Gallatin, Tennessee, and other communities north of Nashville also sustained significant damage.

There were 73 tornadoes confirmed across 13 states, with the bulk of them coming on the afternoon and evening of April 7 across the South, particularly in Tennessee. In total, 10 deaths were reported as a result of the tornadoes, and over $650 million in damage was reported, of which over $630 million was in Middle Tennessee. It was the third major outbreak of 2006, occurring just days after another major outbreak on April 2. It was also considered by some to be the worst disaster event in Middle Tennessee since the 1998 tornado outbreak.

Meteorological synopsis
The outbreak was caused by a powerful low pressure system over the Midwest that produced a powerful cold front, which tracked eastward across the South and combined with warm air from the Gulf of Mexico to form severe thunderstorms; with activity concentrated on April 7.

The National Weather Service's Storm Prediction Center issued a high risk for severe weather for both April 6 and 7, forecasting favorable conditions for an extremely strong tornado outbreak on both days.

However, activity was not as intense as expected on April 6; only 12 tornadoes were confirmed, most of which were in Kansas. Several were damaging, but only a few injuries and no deaths were reported. The reason for the relatively modest level of activity was due to a more stable than expected air mass that day over the region, with lower dew points and less wind shear, despite the absence of a cap (which would have otherwise allowed a much larger outbreak).

Conditions changed the next day in the South as the system moved eastward, with the cold front entering a more conducive environment. The increased wind shear, combined with the high temperatures and humidity levels, produced tornadoes beginning late that morning and continuing throughout the day into the overnight hours. At 2000z, the NWS issued the highest risk possible for tornadoes, a 60% risk. By the day's end, a total of 48 tornadoes developed. Several of them caused significant damage and loss of life. The worst tornadoes hit Middle Tennessee, where 10 people died. In addition to the tornadoes, there were reports of hail as large as softballs, powerful microbursts and straight-line winds, and local flooding. Extensive damage was also reported in the northern suburbs of Atlanta, Georgia, when storms developed there overnight into the early morning of April 8.

Despite a lower risk of activity on April 8, severe weather continued in Alabama, South Carolina, and Georgia — mostly in the early morning hours, with another 13 tornadoes reported before the outbreak finally ended as the system moved offshore into the Atlantic Ocean.

Over the three-day period, 73 tornadoes were confirmed, though the high number of overall tornadoes disguises the fact that most were weak F0 or F1 tornadoes.

Confirmed tornadoes

Aftermath
On the night after the tornado hit Gallatin, there were many reports of looting in the devastated community. A nightly curfew was required to combat the looting and maintain order in the community. There were a total of 23 arrests made. The United States National Guard was called in after the tornado hit to help with security and the removal of the excessive debris. It took 10 days for Volunteer State Community College to re-open after the tornado hit.

The City of Hendersonville did not have tornado sirens at the time of the tornado, but the city installed some soon after the storm.

On September 26, the Greater Nashville Regional Council awarded the authorities involved in the recovery (including the municipalities of Sumner County) the Marshall S. Stuart Memorial Award for outstanding intergovernmental cooperation after the tornado. The quick response by other local authorities, counties and cities was congratulated.

On October 8, an episode of Extreme Makeover: Home Edition featured a family from Hendersonville that had their home being rebuilt after it was destroyed by the tornado. However, insurance issues plus personal injuries held back the recovery for many, and some neighborhoods have been slow to recover. Nonetheless, many homes have been rebuilt in the area.

Images

See also
 List of tornadoes and tornado outbreaks
 Tornadoes of 2006

References

External links
 Storm Prediction Center – preliminary April 7 storm reports log
 Stormtrack Forums – for reports by storm chasers and photographs of the tornadoes

2006 in the United States
Tornadoes of 2006
F3 tornadoes
21st century in Nashville, Tennessee
Tornadoes in Tennessee
Tornadoes in Alabama
Tornadoes in Kansas
April 2006 events in the United States
2006_natural_disasters_in_the_United_States